Stuart James Grimley (born 17 July 1970) is a former Australian politician. He was a Justice Party member of the Victorian Legislative Council between 2018 and 2022, representing Western Victoria Region. He was not re-elected at the 2022 state election.

During his time in parliament, Grimley was the Victorian leader of the party.

Prior to his election to the Victorian Legislative Council, Grimley served as a police officer in Geelong.

References

1970 births
Living people
Derryn Hinch's Justice Party members of the Parliament of Victoria
Members of the Victorian Legislative Council
21st-century Australian politicians